Home Team is a 2022 American biographical sports comedy film directed by Charles and Daniel Kinnane, written by Chris Titone and Keith Blum, and starring Kevin James in the lead role, Taylor Lautner, Rob Schneider, Jackie Sandler, and Tait Blum. Inspired by actual events, the film tells the story of New Orleans Saints head coach Sean Payton who coached his 12-year-old son's football team during his one-year suspension from the NFL.

Home Team was produced by Adam Sandler's Happy Madison Productions and James's Hey Eddie Productions, and filmed in New Orleans from May to June 2021. It was released on January 28, 2022, by Netflix.

Plot

Three years after the New Orleans Saints won Super Bowl XLIV, head coach Sean Payton is suspended from the NFL for one year due to his involvement in the Bountygate scandal. He returns to his hometown and reconnects with his 12-year-old son by coaching his middle-school football team at Liberty Christian in Argyle, Texas.

Cast
 Kevin James as Sean Payton, the coach of the New Orleans Saints.
 Taylor Lautner as Troy Lambert
 Rob Schneider as Jamie, a man who is Beth's latest husband.
 Jackie Sandler as Beth, Sean's ex-wife and Jamie's wife.
 Tait Blum as Connor Payton, the son of Sean Payton and Beth and the stepson of Jamie.
 Gary Valentine as Mitch Bizone
 Maxwell Simkins as Paulie
 Chloe Fineman as Intern Emily
 Jacob Perez as Marcos
 Bryant Tardy as Dennis
 Manny Magnus as Harlan
 Liam Kyle as Nate
 Christopher Farrar as Jason
 Merek Mastrov as Brian
 Isaiah Mustafa as Porcupine Coach
 Christopher Titone as Will
 Ashley D. Kelley as Cindy
 Lavell Crawford as Gus, a bus driver.
 Allen Covert as Referee Covert
 Anthony L. Fernandez as Calvin
 Jared Sandler as Eric, a hotel clerk.
 Sunny Sandler as Brooke
 John Farley as Championship Game Referee
 Dan Patrick as himself
 Jim Nantz as himself
 Sean Payton as Lionel, a janitor.

Production
The film began principal photography on May 10, 2021 and ended on June 6, 2021, in New Orleans. On May 18, 2021, it was reported that Taylor Lautner, Rob Schneider, Jackie Sandler, Gary Valentine, Tait Blum, Maxwell Simkins, Jacob Perez, Bryant Tardy, Manny Magnus, Liam Kyle, Christopher Farrar, Merek Mastrov, Isaiah Mustafa, Christopher Titone, Ashley D. Kelley, Lavell Crawford, Allen Covert, Anthony L. Fernandez, and Jared Sandler joined the cast. The film was directed by Charles Kinnane and Daniel Kinnane, written by Chris Titone and Keith Blum, and produced by Happy Madison Productions and Hey Eddie Productions.

Release
The film was released on January 28, 2022 on Netflix.

Reception 

 On Metacritic, the film has a weighted average score of 23 out of 100 based on reviews from 6 critics, indicating "generally unfavorable reviews".

References

External links
 
 
 

2022 comedy films
2020s American films
2020s children's comedy films
2020s English-language films
2020s sports comedy films
American films based on actual events
American children's comedy films
American football films
American sports comedy films
Comedy films based on actual events
English-language Netflix original films
Films produced by Allen Covert
Films produced by Adam Sandler
Films scored by Rupert Gregson-Williams
Films set in New Orleans
Films set in Texas
Films shot in New Orleans
Happy Madison Productions films
Middle school films
New Orleans Saints
Sports films based on actual events
English-language sports comedy films